Cyril Ring (December 5, 1892July 17, 1967) was an American film actor. He began his career in silent films in 1921.  By the time of his final performance in 1951, he had appeared in over 350 films, nearly all of them in small and/or uncredited bit parts.

Ring is probably best known today for his role as Harvey Yates, a con artist and accomplice to fellow con artist Penelope, played by Kay Francis  in the Marx Brothers first film The Cocoanuts (1929). He also appeared in uncredited small parts in two other Marx films, Monkey Business (1931) and  A Day at the Races (1937).

Biography
Born in Massachusetts, he was the brother of actress Blanche Ring and the first husband of actress/dancer Charlotte Greenwood (from 1915 to 1922; divorced). He died on July 17, 1967 in Hollywood, California, aged 74.

Reviews
The Cocoanuts was Ring's most prominent role. In the New York Times review on May 25, 1929, Mordaunt Hall singled Ring out for criticism: "Cyril Ring, in an amateurish fashion, does the honors as the conspiring Mr. Yates, whose great hope in this adventure is to cash in on Mrs. Potter's gems. Mr. Ring, who has impersonated regiments of villains on the silent screen, here plays his part as though everybody but his determined female partner were both sightless and deaf."

Marx Brothers historian Matthew Coniam observed, "It seems to me he makes a perfectly good job of villainous Harvey Yates in The Cocoanuts. But for some reason he got the most terrible reviews, and his career didn't so much decline as nosedive almost immediately afterwards."

Selected filmography

The Conquest of Canaan (1921) as Gene Louden
Divorce Coupons (1922) as Conrad Fontaine
Back Home and Broke (1922) as Eustace Grimley
The Ne'er-Do-Well (1923)
The Exciters (1923) as Roger Patton
Homeward Bound (1923) as Rufus Brent Jr
Pied Piper Malone (1924) as Charles Crosby Jr.
The Breaking Point (1924) as Louis Bassett
The Guilty One (1924) as H. Beverly Graves
Hit and Run (1924) as George Collins
In Hollywood with Potash and Perlmutter (1924) as Partington
Tongues of Flame (1924) as Clayton
Mismates (1926) as Helwig
News Parade (1928) as Prince Oscar
The Cocoanuts (1929) as Yates
The Social Lion (1930) as Ralph Williams
Top Speed (1930) as Vincent Colgate (uncredited)
Millie (1931) as Bailey (uncredited)
Don't Bet on Women (1931) as Jeanne's Dancing Partner (uncredited)
Bad Sister (1931) as Doctor (uncredited)
Monkey Business (1931) as Party Guest (uncredited)
Union Depot (1932) as Track 4 Ticket Taker (uncredited)
Sky Devils (1932) as Military Policeman (uncredited)
Business and Pleasure (1932) as Arthur Jones
Disorderly Conduct (1932) as Nightclub Patron (uncredited)
It's Tough to Be Famous (1932) as Reporter from the Star (uncredited)
The Dark Horse (1932) as Airport Clerk (uncredited)
The Purchase Price (1932) as Second Man Joan Sings To (uncredited)
Madison Square Garden (1932) as Sports Reporter (uncredited)
Secrets of the French Police (1932) as Minor Role (uncredited)
The Half-Naked Truth (1932) as Phelps (uncredited)
Two Lips and Juleps (1932)
Murders in the Zoo (1933) as Banquet Guest (uncredited)
Emergency Call (1933) as Dr. Lenehan (uncredited)
International House (1933) as Mr. Brown as Assistant Hotel Manager (uncredited)
A Shriek in the Night (1933) as Eddie, Morgue Attendant (uncredited)
 Neighbors' Wives (1933) as Bill Cooper
Too Much Harmony (1933) as Stage Manager (uncredited)
Tillie and Gus (1933) as Poker Player (uncredited)
Meet the Baron (1933) as Mayor's 'Yes' Man (uncredited)
Dark Hazard (1934) as Man at Third Roulette Table (uncredited)
No More Bridge! (1934, Short)
Sisters Under the Skin (1934) as Bored Man
The Most Precious Thing in Life (1934) as Motel Clerk (uncredited)
Hollywood Hoodlum (1934) as Duke as Tony's Assistant
Call It Luck (1934) as Man at Window (uncredited)
Behold My Wife! (1934) as Society Man at Party (uncredited)
The Gilded Lily (1935) as Headwaiter (uncredited)
Goin' to Town (1935) as Stage Manager (uncredited)
Black Sheep (1935) as Passenger (uncredited)
Hooray for Love (1935) as Second Radio Official Firing Doug (uncredited)
Love Me Forever (1935) as Auction Spectator (uncredited)
The Murder Man (1935) as Man at Defense Table (uncredited)
Don't Bet on Blondes (1935) as Man with $30,000 Bettor (uncredited)
Shanghai (1935) as Reporter from 'Free Press' (uncredited)
Dante's Inferno (1935) as Drunk in Cabin (uncredited)
Page Miss Glory (1935) as Reporter (uncredited)
Diamond Jim (1935) as Fireman (uncredited)
Navy Wife (1935) as Ship Passenger (uncredited)
Two-Fisted (1935) as Companion to Briggs (uncredited)
It's in the Air (1935) as Drake's Assistant (uncredited)
Rendezvous (1935) as Orderly (uncredited)
The Payoff (1935) as Reporter (uncredited)
Music Is Magic (1935) as Cafe Patron (uncredited)
Thanks a Million (1935) as Audience Member (uncredited)
The Man Who Broke the Bank at Monte Carlo (1935) as Casino Bar Patron (uncredited)
Man of Iron (1935) as Golfer (uncredited)
The Bride Comes Home (1935) as Party Guest (uncredited)
Dangerous (1935) as Rehearsal Observer (uncredited)
Hitch Hike Lady (1935) as Information Clerk (uncredited)
King of Burlesque (1936) as Auctioneer's Assistant (uncredited)
Song and Dance Man (1936) as Hotel Clerk (uncredited)
Everybody's Old Man (1936) as Salesman (uncredited)
Colleen (1936) as Client with Ames Company Official (uncredited)
The Great Ziegfeld (1936) as Reporter (uncredited)
The First Baby (1936) as Wedding Guest (uncredited)
Gentle Julia (1936) as Neighbor at Dance (uncredited)
Palm Springs (1936) as Reception Clerk (uncredited)
The Border Patrolman (1936) as Ed Hendricks (uncredited)
A Son Comes Home (1936) as Reporter (uncredited)
Charlie Chan at the Race Track (1936) as Race Track Patron (uncredited)
The Man Who Lived Twice (1936) as Heifetz Concert Attendee (uncredited)
Wedding Present (1936) as Reporter (uncredited)
15 Maiden Lane (1936) as Party Guest (uncredited)
Pigskin Parade (1936) as Professor at Meeting (uncredited)
Polo Joe (1936) as Spectator (uncredited)
Go West, Young Man (1936) as Reporter (uncredited)
Love on the Run (1936) as Wally as a Reporter (uncredited)
More Than a Secretary (1936) as Department Head (uncredited)
College Holiday (1936) as Customer (uncredited)
After the Thin Man (1936) as Reporter (uncredited)
God's Country and the Woman (1937) as Passerby (uncredited)
Criminal Lawyer (1937) as Extra at Larkin's Nightclub (uncredited)
Time Out for Romance (1937) as Reporter (uncredited)
When You're in Love (1937) as Man Outside Dressing Room (uncredited)
A Doctor's Diary (1937) as Dr. Merrick (uncredited)
When's Your Birthday? (1937) as Charity Bazarr Extra (uncredited)
A Family Affair (1937) as Convention Delegate on Platform (uncredited)
Swing High, Swing Low (1937) as Visitor Leaving Ship (uncredited)
Nobody's Baby (1937) as Nightclub Patron (uncredited)
Make Way for Tomorrow (1937) as Guest in Vogard Hotel Lobby (uncredited)
Melody for Two (1937) as Nightclub Table Extra (uncredited)
There Goes My Girl (1937) as Wedding Guest (uncredited)
It May Happen to You (1937, Short) as Intern (uncredited)
A Day at the Races (1937) as Racetrack Spectator (uncredited)
Married Before Breakfast (1937) as Nightclub Patron (uncredited)
Slim (1937) as Extra Dancing in Nightclub (uncredited)
Wake Up and Live (1937) as Radio Man in Control Booth (uncredited)
Topper (1937) as Nightclub Patron (uncredited)
That Certain Woman (1937) as Hotel Lobby Extra (uncredited)
The Life of the Party (1937) as Night Club Extra (uncredited)
One Hundred Men and a Girl (1937) as Concert Attendee (uncredited)
It Happened in Hollywood (1937) as Rudy as Cameraman (uncredited)
The Women Men Marry (1937) as Doorman (uncredited)
Charlie Chan on Broadway (1937) as Candid Camera Fan at Hottentot Club (uncredited)
There Goes the Groom (1937) as Class Reunion Greeter (uncredited)
Fight for Your Lady (1937) as Wrestling Spectator (uncredited)
52nd Street (1937) as Nightclub Patron (uncredited)
Navy Blue and Gold (1937) as Naval Officer at Football Game (uncredited)
Blossoms on Broadway (1937) as Reporter (uncredited)
Nothing Sacred (1937) as Pilot (uncredited)
She Married an Artist (1937) as Reporter (uncredited)
Wells Fargo (1937) as Minor Role (uncredited)
The Last Gangster (1937)
City Girl (1938) as Cigar Stand Proprietor (uncredited)
Love Is a Headache (1938) as Reporter (uncredited)
Little Miss Roughneck (1938) as Ward (uncredited)
Dangerous to Know (1938) as Guest at Party (uncredited)
The First Hundred Years (1938) as Night Club Patron (uncredited)
King of the Newsboys (1938) as Businessman (uncredited)
Goodbye Broadway (1938) as Minor Role (uncredited)
Test Pilot (1938) as N.A.A. Official (uncredited)
Joy of Living (1938) as Man in Margaret's Dressing Room (uncredited)
Hold That Kiss (1938) as Dog Show Attendee (uncredited)
Holiday (1938) as Churchgoer (uncredited)
One Wild Night (1938) as Bank Employee (uncredited)
Always Goodbye (1938) as Fashion Show Patron (uncredited)
The Crowd Roars (1938) as Ringsider (uncredited)
Block-Heads (1938) as Elevator Passenger (uncredited)
I Am the Law (1938) as Photographer (uncredited)
Three Loves Has Nancy (1938) as Man at Party (uncredited)
Too Hot to Handle (1938) as Cameraman (uncredited)
Hold That Co-ed (1938) as Radio Reporter on Football Field (uncredited)
The Spider's Web (1938) as Henry Blake (uncredited)
Young Dr. Kildare (1938) as Intern (uncredited)
Sharpshooters (1938) as Newsman (uncredited)
The Shining Hour (1938) as Candid Cameraman (uncredited)
Up the River (1938) as Well-Wisher (uncredited)
Gambling Ship (1938) as Croupier (uncredited)
Sweethearts (1938) as Waiter (uncredited)
Kentucky (1938) as Dancer (uncredited)
Trade Winds (1938) as Party Guest (uncredited)
Disbarred (1939) as Jury Foreman (uncredited)
They Made Me a Criminal (1939) as First Fight Ringsider (uncredited)
North of Shanghai (1939) as Minor Role (uncredited)
Made for Each Other (1939) as Office Worker (uncredited)
Let Freedom Ring (1939) as Rancher (uncredited)
Society Smugglers (1939) as Party Guest (uncredited)
Mystery Plane (1939) as Henchman (uncredited)
King of Chinatown (1939) as Fight Spectator (uncredited)
The Adventures of Jane Arden (1939) as Man Buying Newspaper (uncredited)
First Offenders (1939) as Reporter (uncredited)
Zenobia (1939) as Townsman (uncredited)
Union Pacific (1939) as Surveyor (uncredited)
The Rookie Cop (1939) as Second Glove Salesman (uncredited)
Man of Conquest (1939) as Ball Attendee (uncredited)
Lucky Night (1939) as Bus Passenger (uncredited)
Rose of Washington Square (1939) as Master of Ceremonies at Cast Party (uncredited)
Mandrake the Magician (1939, Serial) as Magic Mart Henchman (uncredited)
Invitation to Happiness (1939) as Reporter at Fight (uncredited)
It Could Happen to You (1939) as Reporter (uncredited)
Good Girls Go to Paris (1939) as Wedding Guest (uncredited)
Second Fiddle (1939) as Florist (uncredited)
Mr. Moto Takes a Vacation (1939) as Museum Exhibit Attendee (uncredited)
Winter Carnival (1939) as Reporter at Terminal (uncredited)
Miracles for Sale (1939) as Numbers' Man (uncredited)
Our Leading Citizen (1939) as Delegate (uncredited)
Golden Boy (1939) as Extra in Moody's New Office (uncredited)
Blackmail (1939) as Ramey's Butler (uncredited)
Babes in Arms (1939) as Vaudevilian Celebrant (uncredited)
Espionage Agent (1939) as Spectator at Dart Throwing (uncredited)
Hollywood Cavalcade (1939) as First Row Extra in Theater Audience (uncredited)
The Roaring Twenties (1939) as Charlie (uncredited)
Day-Time Wife (1939) as Nightclub Patron (uncredited)
Private Detective (1939) as Man Buying Newspaper (uncredited)
Remember? (1939) as Party Guest (uncredited)
Slightly Honorable (1939) as Nightclub Patron (uncredited)
The Light That Failed (1939) as War Correspondent (uncredited)
Mexican Spitfire (1940) as Man at Bachelor Party (uncredited)
The Man Who Wouldn't Talk (1940) as Reporter (uncredited)
I Take This Woman (1940) as Night Club Extra (uncredited)
Broadway Melody of 1940 (1940) as Show Backer at Rehearsal / Nightclub Headwaiter (uncredited)
The House Across the Bay (1940) as Dancer (uncredited)
Road to Singapore (1940) as Ship's Officer (uncredited)
Johnny Apollo (1940) as Cashier (uncredited)
The Man with Nine Lives (1940) as Doctor Spectator (uncredited)
Two Girls on Broadway (1940) as Bartell's Second Assistant (uncredited)
Irene (1940) as Charity Ball Guest (uncredited)
My Favorite Wife (1940) as Nick's Lawyer (uncredited)
Beyond Tomorrow (1940) as Man Reporting No Hope for Crash Victims (uncredited)
Edison, the Man (1940) as Reporter (uncredited)
Those Were the Days! (1940) as Mr. Sanford (uncredited)
Girl in 313 (1940) as Bartender (uncredited)
Sailor's Lady (1940) as Lieutenant Commander—Arizona (uncredited)
Sporting Blood (1940) as Man at Race Track (uncredited)
My Love Came Back (1940) as Party Guest (uncredited)
Girls of the Road (1940) as Pickup Man at Bus Depot (uncredited)
The Boys from Syracuse (1940) as Guard
Pier 13 (1940) as Engagement Party Guest (uncredited)
The Golden Fleecing (1940) as Cameraman (uncredited)
Rhythm on the River (1940) as Party Guest (uncredited)
The Leather Pushers (1940) as Ringsider (uncredited)
Hired Wife (1940) as Office Worker (uncredited)
No Time for Comedy (1940) as Backstage Man (uncredited)
The Bride Wore Crutches (1940) as Gas Station Attendant (uncredited)
Sky Murder (1940) as Party Guest (uncredited)
Dulcy (1940) as Silent Reporter (uncredited)
Third Finger, Left Hand (1940) as Man at Railroad Station (uncredited)
The Great Dictator (1940) as Officer Extra (uncredited)
North West Mounted Police (1940) as Mountie (uncredited)
Christmas in July (1940) as Coworker (uncredited)
One Night in the Tropics (1940) as Club Roscoe Maitre d' (uncredited)
Life with Henry (1940) as Theatre Patron (uncredited)
Little Nellie Kelly (1940) as Man Bumped by Dennis (uncredited)
Charter Pilot (1940) as Radio Operator 'Sparks' (uncredited)
No, No, Nanette (1940) as Desk Clerk (uncredited)
Michael Shayne, Private Detective (1940) as Reporter (uncredited)
Honeymoon for Three (1941) as Hotel Restaurant Patron (uncredited)
The Wild Man of Borneo (1941) as Passerby in Atlas Building (uncredited)
Ride, Kelly, Ride (1941) as Photographer (uncredited)
The Lady Eve (1941) as Husband on Ship (uncredited)
A Girl, a Guy, and a Gob (1941) as Hustler (uncredited)
The Lone Wolf Takes a Chance (1941) as Hotel Manager (uncredited)
Meet John Doe (1941) as Radio Technician (uncredited)
Las Vegas Nights (1941) as Club Nevada Patron (uncredited)
The Man Who Lost Himself (1941) as Relative (uncredited)
The Great Lie (1941) as Harry Anderson (uncredited)
Citizen Kane (1941) as Newspaperman at Trenton Town Hall (uncredited)
For Beauty's Sake (1941) as Hotel Desk Clerk (uncredited)
Blondie in Society (1941) as Salesman (uncredited)
San Antonio Rose (1941) as Man at Bar (uncredited)
Accent on Love (1941) as Court Clerk (uncredited)
Ringside Maisie (1941) as Reporter (uncredited)
Kiss the Boys Goodbye (1941) as Reporter at Party (uncredited)
Our Wife (1941) as Shipboard Passenger (uncredited)
Here Comes Mr. Jordan (1941) as Board Member (uncredited)
Ice-Capades (1941) as Photographer (uncredited)
Lady Be Good (1941) as Party Guest (uncredited)
Harmon of Michigan (1941) as Carter (uncredited)
You'll Never Get Rich (1941) as Passerby on Street (uncredited)
The Stork Pays Off (1941) as Father (uncredited)
Great Guns (1941) as Canteen Clerk (uncredited)
Three Girls About Town (1941) as Extra at Labor Meeting (uncredited)
Public Enemies (1941) as Reporter
Birth of the Blues (1941) as Cafe Patron (uncredited)
I Wake Up Screaming (1941) as Reporter
New York Town (1941) as Spectator (uncredited)
Blues in the Night (1941) as Gambler at Dice Table (uncredited)
Keep 'Em Flying (1941) as Nightclub Extra (uncredited)
I Killed That Man (1941) as Reporter (uncredited)
Marry the Boss's Daughter (1941) as Vice-President (uncredited)
Two-Faced Woman (1941) as Dancer (uncredited)
Sullivan's Travels (1941) as Reporter (uncredited)
Glamour Boy (1941) as Nightclub Patron (uncredited)
Steel Against the Sky (1941) as Harry (scenes deleted)
Louisiana Purchase (1941) as Senator (uncredited)
Lady for a Night (1942) as King's Club Patron (uncredited)
Blue, White and Perfect (1942) as Court Clerk (uncredited)
All Through the Night (1942) as Reporter (uncredited)
Call Out the Marines (1942) as Man at Racetrack (uncredited)
Brooklyn Orchid (1942) as Party Guest (uncredited)
Woman of the Year (1942) as Mr. Harding's Chauffeur (uncredited)
Sleepytime Gal (1942) as Clerk (uncredited)
Sing Your Worries Away (1942) as Bartender (uncredited)
Yokel Boy (1942) as Reporter (uncredited)
Secret Agent of Japan (1942) as American Businessman (uncredited)
Saboteur (1942) as Party Guest (uncredited)
Fingers at the Window (1942) as Psychiatrist at Lecture (uncredited)
Hello, Annapolis (1942) as Reporter (uncredited)
Home in Wyomin''' (1942) as Monitor Man (uncredited)My Gal Sal (1942) as Loud Customer's Friend (uncredited)Take a Letter, Darling (1942) as Job Applicant / Nightclub Patron (uncredited)Dr. Broadway (1942) as Diner (uncredited)This Gun for Hire (1942) as Neptune Club Waiter (uncredited)Meet the Stewarts (1942) as Country Club Guest (uncredited)My Favorite Spy (1942) as Nightclub Patron (uncredited)It Happened in Flatbush (1942) as Reporter (uncredited)Maisie Gets Her Man (1942) as Dance Floor Extra (uncredited)The Magnificent Dope (1942) as Street Extra (uncredited)The Pride of the Yankees (1942) as Photographer (uncredited)Joan of Ozark (1942) as Reporter (uncredited)Priorities on Parade (1942) as Booking Agent (uncredited)Holiday Inn (1942) as Man in Montage (uncredited)Tales of Manhattan (1942) as Assistant Tailor (Boyer sequence) (uncredited)Sabotage Squad (1942) as Jefferson (uncredited)Across the Pacific (1942) as Canadian Officer (uncredited)The Glass Key (1942) as  Campaign Headquarters Waiter (uncredited)Lucky Legs (1942) as Yacht Salesman (uncredited)Army Surgeon (1942) as Maj. Peterson (uncredited)The Navy Comes Through (1942) as Mr. Reynolds (uncredited)I Married a Witch (1942) as Country Club Extra (uncredited)Boston Blackie Goes Hollywood (1942) as Hotel Manager (uncredited)That Other Woman (1942) as Angry Businessman (uncredited)Silver Queen (1942) as Gambler (uncredited)Life Begins at Eight-Thirty (1942) as Box Office Man (uncredited)A Night to Remember (1942) as Restaurant Patron (uncredited)Pittsburgh (1942) as Mr. Wilcox (uncredited)The Traitor Within (1942) as Henchman (uncredited)Ice-Capades Revue (1942) as Creditor (uncredited)Over My Dead Body (1942) as Court ClerkThe McGuerins from Brooklyn (1942) as Man at Roulette Table (uncredited)Happy Go Lucky (1943) as Nightclub Patron / Carnival Participant (uncredited)Margin for Error (1943) as Drugstore Clerk (uncredited)Immortal Sergeant (1943) as Man at Train Depot as Soldiers Depart (uncredited)The Hard Way (1943) as Nightclub Patron (uncredited)You Can't Beat the Law (1943) as Convict (uncredited)Reveille with Beverly (1943) as Radio Technician (uncredited)The Meanest Man in the World (1943) as Client (uncredited)The Amazing Mrs. Holliday (1943) as Party Guest (uncredited)Two Weeks to Live (1943) as Airplane Pilot (uncredited)Dixie Dugan (1943) (uncredited)Slightly Dangerous (1943) as Man Outside Newspaper Office (uncredited)She Has What It Takes (1943) as Photographer (uncredited)Good Morning, Judge (1943) as Elizabeth's Escort (uncredited)A Stranger in Town (1943) as Newspaper Reporter (uncredited)Bombardier (1943) as Capt. Randall (uncredited)Du Barry Was a Lady (1943) as Man Watching Radio Interview (uncredited)Mr. Lucky (1943) as Gambler (uncredited)The Constant Nymph (1943) as Party Guest (uncredited)Dixie (1943) as Fireman (uncredited)Batman (1943, Serial) as Restaurant Patron (uncredited)Hers to Hold (1943) as Photographer (uncredited)The Falcon in Danger (1943) as Man at Airport (uncredited)Let's Face It (1943) as Headwaiter (uncredited)The Fallen Sparrow (1943) as Henry as Headwaiter (uncredited)The Seventh Victim (1943) as Devil Worshipper (uncredited)Holy Matrimony (1943) as Mourner / Spectator at Westminster Abbey (uncredited)Melody Parade (1943) as AdamsSo This Is Washington (1943) as Second Hotel Desk Clerk (uncredited)The Adventures of a Rookie (1943) as Army Major with Dispatches (uncredited)The Kansan (1943) as Court Clerk (uncredited)Sweet Rosie O'Grady (1943) as Photographer (uncredited)The Unknown Guest (1943) as Pool Hall Proprietor (uncredited)The Iron Major (1943) as Ross (uncredited)Gildersleeve on Broadway (1943) as Nightclub Patron (uncredited)Swing Fever (1943) as Man Entering Club (uncredited)Mystery of the 13th Guest (1943) as John Barksdale as LawyerGovernment Girl (1943) as Naval Lieutenant Commander (uncredited)The Mad Ghoul (1943) as Man in Audience (uncredited)The Dancing Masters (1943) as Bus Passenger (uncredited)Campus Rhythm (1943) as Trigonometry Teacher (uncredited)Where Are Your Children? (1943) as Juvenile Court Officer (uncredited)The Texas Kid (1943) as Tim AtwoodThere's Something About a Soldier (1943) as Officer at Graduation (uncredited)How to Operate Behind Enemy Lines (1943) as Enemy Agent X (uncredited) Night Club Patron (uncredited)
Higher and Higher (1943) as Night Club Patron (uncredited)
Henry Aldrich, Boy Scout (1944) as Scoring Official (uncredited)
Timber Queen (1944) as Nightclub Patron (uncredited)
The Fighting Seabees (1944) as Dance Extra (uncredited)
Phantom Lady (1944) as Barfly with Racing Form (uncredited)
Shine on Harvest Moon (1944) as Harmon as Mr. Harvey's Associate (uncredited)
My Best Gal (1944) (uncredited)
Hot Rhythm (1944) as Jackson
And the Angels Sing (1944) as Casino Patron (uncredited)
Follow the Boys (1944) as Laughtonpher (uncredited)
The Story of Dr. Wassell (1944) as Dr. Holmes' Board Member (uncredited)
Once Upon a Time (1944) as Man (uncredited)
Mr. Skeffington (1944) as Perry Lanks (uncredited)
Ladies of Washington (1944) as Crane's Secretary (uncredited)
Ghost Catchers (1944) as Man in Tuxedo (uncredited)
Christmas Holiday (1944) as Jury Member (uncredited)
Secret Command (1944) as Parrish (uncredited)
In Society (1944) as Sir Walter Raleigh at Party (uncredited)
The Merry Monahans (1944) as Poker Player (uncredited)
Laura (1944) as Party Guest (uncredited)
Here Come the Waves (1944) as Lieutenant Colonel (uncredited)
The Affairs of Susan (1945) as Mr. Hughes (uncredited)
The Man in Half Moon Street (1945) as O'Hara—Plainclothesman (uncredited)
Roughly Speaking (1945) as Lawyer (uncredited)
Frisco Sal (1945) as Sightseer (uncredited)
See My Lawyer (1945) as Man in Mud Gag (uncredited)
I'll Remember April (1945) as Advertising Executive (uncredited)
Identity Unknown (1945) as Mr. Bartlett (uncredited)
Having Wonderful Crime (1945) as Hotel Clerk (uncredited)
Hollywood and Vine (1945) as Richard Hudson as Attorney (uncredited)
The Bullfighters (1945) as Cafe Customer (uncredited)
Where Do We Go from Here? (1945) as Capt. Williams (uncredited)
Blonde Ransom (1945) as Patron (uncredited)
The Naughty Nineties (1945) as Man in Water Gag (uncredited)
On Stage Everybody (1945) as Onlooker (uncredited)
The Cheaters (1945) as Steve as Private Detective (uncredited)
Incendiary Blonde (1945) as New Year's Eve Patron (uncredited)
Lady on a Train (1945) as CIrcus Club Ringmaster (uncredited)
Swingin' on a Rainbow (1945) as Bit (uncredited)
Beware of Redheads (1945, Short) as Ed Brooks
Duffy's Tavern (1945) as Gaffer (uncredited)
Senorita from the West (1945) as Bystander (uncredited)
Diamond Horseshoe (1945)
Girl on the Spot (1946) as Hobart (uncredited)
Miss Susie Slagle's (1946) as Instrument Man (uncredited)
The Strange Love of Martha Ivers (1946) as Nightclub Extra (uncredited)
Our Hearts Were Growing Up (1946) as Hotel Desk Clerk (uncredited)
Night and Day (1946) as Husband Outside Theatre (uncredited)
Two Years Before the Mast (1946) as Ship Owner (uncredited)
Nobody Lives Forever (1946) as Blond's Escort (uncredited)
Hollywood Barn Dance (1947) as Theatre Manager
The Hal Roach Comedy Carnival (1947) as Bill, in 'Fabulous Joe'
The Fabulous Joe (1947) as Bill (uncredited)
Magic Town (1947) as Newspaper Man (uncredited)
Nighmare Alley (1947) as Roustabout at Final Carnival (uncredited)
Body and Soul (1947) as Victor as Butler (uncredited)
The Flame (1947) as Mr. Moffett (uncredited)
Return of the Bad Men (1948) as Ardmore Bank Clerk (uncredited)
Hollow Triumph (1948) as Harry (uncredited)
An Innocent Affair (1948) as Rocket Roof Maitre d' (uncredited)
Tulsa (1949) as Dice Table Croupier (uncredited)
Red, Hot and Blue (1949) as Reporter (uncredited)
Iron Man (1951) as Headwaiter (uncredited) (final film role)

References

External links

1892 births
1967 deaths
American male silent film actors
Male actors from Massachusetts
Place of birth missing
20th-century American male actors